Shaw Plaza, also known as Shaw Plaza-Twin Heights is a mixed-use development in Balestier, Singapore. The plaza is currently under major renovations.

History
The plaza was opened in 1999, replacing an earlier Shaw Plaza, which had existed for at least fourteen years, the Hoover Theatre, and the President Theatre, by the Shaw Organisation. The plaza is located along Balestier Road, and contains 132 residential units on top of the shopping plaza. However, the residential units are separated from the mall. The shopping centre also included the Balestier Cineplex, which replaced the Hoover Theatre. The cineplex had six screens.

The entire complex is currently undergoing renovation works.

References

1999 establishments in Singapore